Aynak is a place in Afghanistan's Logar province, about 30 km south-southeast of Kabul. It is the site of a large copper deposit.

See also 
 Mes Aynak

References 

Populated places in Logar Province